Chuck Moller was an American football coach and from April 2017 until his death, served as the head football coach at Bradshaw Mountain High School in Prescott Valley, Arizona. Moller’s collegiate head coaching experience consisted of one season (2011) at the University of Minnesota Crookston, where he finished with a record of 1–10.

Head coaching record

College

References

Living people
American football offensive guards
Minnesota Crookston Golden Eagles football coaches
Minnesota Morris Cougars football coaches
Minnesota Morris Cougars football players
New Mexico Lobos football coaches
North Dakota State Bison football coaches
Oklahoma State Cowboys football coaches
Pittsburg State Gorillas football coaches
Stanford Cardinal football coaches
Texas State Bobcats football coaches
High school football coaches in Arizona
Junior college football coaches in the United States
1962 births